The China Railways SL3 (勝利3, Shènglì, "victory") class steam locomotive was a class of 4-6-2 passenger steam locomotives operated by the China Railway. They were originally built for the South Manchuria Railway, the Manchukuo National Railway and the North China Transportation Company by several Japanese manufacturers between 1934 and 1940. They were designed in 1933 based on the design of the first Pashisa class locomotives (later reclassified Pashishi class); the first order was placed by Mantetsu in March of that year.

History

After the Chosen Government Railway Bureau entrusted the management of the North Chosen Line between Cheongjin and Unggi in Korea to the South Manchuria Railway (Mantetsu), Mantetsu ordered sixteen of these locomotives, which were built in 1934 and 1935 by Hitachi and Kisha Seizō of Japan. These were designated Pashisa (パシサ) class, after the previous class of locomotives with that designation were reclassified Pashiha class in 1933. Care was taken during the design process to maximise the commonality of parts between these engines and those of the MNR Mikaro, Mantetsu Mikasa and Mantetsu Mikaro class freight locomotives.

The Mantetsu Pashisa class was identical to the Manchukuo National's Pashishi (パシシ) class, which were built to use lignite fuel. The first ten of these were built by Hitachi in 1934, these were called the "National Small Pashi" (國小パシ). After the acquisition of the Chinese Eastern Railway in March 1935 and the conversion of its mainline from Harbin to Xinjing from  Russian gauge to standard gauge, they were used to pull express trains, including the Asia Express, on that section. At the end of 1935, when the emperor of Manchukuo, Puyi, visited Harbin for the first time, his train was hauled by one of these locomotives. 

This new design, dubbed "New National Small Pashi" (新國小パシ), were  heavier than the National Small Pashi, and twenty were built for the Manchukuo National in 1936 by Hitachi and  Kisha Seizō.

In the unified classification scheme of 1938, the Mantetsu Pashisa and Manchukuo National Pashishi classes were combined as the Pashisa class.

Twenty were built by Hitachi in 1939 for North China Transport, numbered 1501 through 1520, followed by another 30 in 1939–1940 from Kisha Seizō, numbered 1521 through 1550.

Postwar

China Railways SL3 (勝利3)

The thirty Pashisa-class locomotives belonging to the Manchukuo National were assigned to the Fengtian (1), the Jilin (5), the Mudanjiang (7), and the Qiqihar Railway Bureaus (11), and six were out on loan to other railways. These, along with the thirty belonging to North China Transport, were taken over by the Republic of China Railway. In 1951, they were classified class ㄆㄒ三 (PX3) by the China Railway, becoming class SL3 (勝利, Shènglì, "victory") in 1959; they were initially numbered in the 101–270 range (other sources say 101–188). In 1980, twelve locomotives with numbers ranging from 114 to 264 were seen in service around China, including in Shanghai, Beijing, Zhengzhou and Guangzhou. SL3 152 is preserved at the China Railway Museum in Beijing.

Korean State Railway 바시서 (Pasisŏ) class
At the end of the Pacific War, all of Mantetsu's Pashisa-class locomotives were in northern Korea: eleven were assigned to the Rajin Railway Burea for operations on Mantetsu's North Chosen Line, whilst the remaining five were out on loan to the Chosen Government Railway (Sentetsu). These were taken over by the Korean State Railway in North Korea, where they were designated 바시서 (Pasisŏ) class (not to be confused with the Pashisa-class inherited from Sentetsu). Little is known about their service lives in North Korea, but they were likely retired by the late 1960s.

Class Specifications

References

4-6-2 locomotives
Hitachi locomotives
Kisha Seizo locomotives
Railway locomotives introduced in 1934
Steam locomotives of China
Standard gauge locomotives of China
Rolling stock of Manchukuo
Locomotives of Korea
Locomotives of North Korea
Passenger locomotives